5-Methyluridine triphosphate or m5UTP is one of five nucleoside triphosphates.  It is the ribonucleoside triphosphate of thymidine, but the nomenclature with "5-methyluridine" is used because the term thymidine triphosphate is used for the deoxyribonucleoside by convention.

References

Nucleotides
Phosphate esters